The 2022 Copa Paulino Alcantara was the fourth edition of the Copa Paulino Alcantara, the domestic football cup competition of the Philippines. The 2022 edition marked the first time since the 2019 Copa Paulino Alcantara that matches are not held in a "bubble format", and also the first season in more than two years that allowed spectators to watch the matches, all of which are held at the PFF National Training Center in Carmona, Cavite. The final saw United City grab a narrow 3–2 win over defending champions Kaya–Iloilo in the highest-scoring final to date. As a result, United City won their second Copa title. They last won the title in the 2019, as Ceres–Negros.

Scheduling
The COVID-19 pandemic still persists as of 2022, which led to the cancellation of the league tournament in 2021 and the commencement of the 2021 Copa Paulino Alcantara in its place. The 2022 Copa Paulino Alcantara is scheduled to start in March 14 with the final set to be held on May 23.

Participating clubs 
All seven clubs of the Philippines Football League participated. The 2021 season was cancelled and not held but the league had a new club, Dynamic Herb Cebu which already took part in the 2021 cup tournament. United City and Maharlika Manila are set to make a return after foregoing the 2021 cup tournament.

Format

Competition
Unlike previous editions of the Copa, where the teams would be separated into different groups, this year's edition of the competition will see all the current teams of the Philippines Football League play against each other once. The 7 clubs, playing in what is dubbed as the "elimination round", will play against each other once. At the end of the elimination round, the top four teams will then meet each other in the semifinals, with the first-placed team facing the fourth-placed team, while the second-placed team faced the third-placed team, similar to the Finals Series in the inaugural PFL season. Just like in the 2021 edition, the losers of the semifinals will play each other in the third place match while the winners meet in the final, which will consist of a single match.

The Azkals Development Team initially finished fourth place in the elimination round, but due to the national team's participation in the 2021 Southeast Asian Games, the ADT were forced to cede their semifinal slot to Stallion Laguna, who finished fifth above Maharlika Manila on goal difference.
The competition will be held in a closed-circuit format due to the COVID-19 pandemic. All matches will be held at the PFF National Training Center in Carmona, Cavite.

Elimination round 

Notes:
 a  Dynamic Herb Cebu was awarded a 3–0 win due to ADT's inability to compete. The ADT forms the core of the Philippine national U23 team which held a training camp in Malaysia as part of its preparation for the 2021 Southeast Asian Games.

Knock-out stage

Semi-finals

Third place play-off

Final

Top scorers

Awards

References

Copa Paulino Alcantara seasons
2022 in Philippine football